Orzinuovi is a town and comune in the province of Brescia, in Lombardy, Italy.

History
It was founded in 1193 by statute of the comune of Brescia, as a boundary fortress with the name of "Orci Novi". Its history thenceforth closely follows that of Brescia, sharing the Venetian dominion from 1466 until Venice's demise in 1797. It became part of Napoleon's Italian states until 1815, when it became part of the Kingdom of Lombardy–Venetia, as part of the Austrian Empire. This continued until the Second Italian Independence War. From 1860 it has been part of the Italy/Kingdom of Italy.

In the 2010s, Orzinuovi was involved in an illicit traffic of solid toxic waste treatment which concerns the bordering municipalities.

Frazioni
Coniolo (Eastern Lombard: Cuniöl)
Barco
Pudiano
Ovanengo
Rossa

See also
Orceana Calcio, the football club of Orzinuovi
Pallacanestro Orzinuovi, the basketball club of Orzinuovi.

Sources

External links

maps of Orzinuovi

Cities and towns in Lombardy
1193 establishments in Europe
12th-century establishments in Italy
Populated places established in the 12th century